Tenthredopsis friesei, the common sawfly, is a species belonging to the family Tenthredinidae.

Description

Adults can be encountered from May through June feeding on nectar and pollen. The larvae feed on Holcus mollis.

Distribution
These sawflies are mainly present in Austria, Belgium, British Isles, Croatia, Czech Republic, Denmark, France, Germany, Italy, North Macedonia, Poland, Romania, Russia, Slovakia, Spain and Switzerland.

References

Tenthredinidae
Insects described in 1887